Gary Dehan is a British voice actor and current CEO of Vyond. He had a small role in the English version of Sonic the Hedgehog: The Movie, dubbing the voice of the character Hyper Metal Sonic.

Filmography
Sonic the Hedgehog (OVA) - Metal Sonic (credited as "Hyper Metal Sonic")
Sakura Diaries - Additional Voices
Variable Geo - Washio
Queen Emeraldas - Communications Officer
Ninja Resurrection - Musashi's Lookout, Sajuro Date
City Hunter: The Motion Picture - Professor Muto, Cop, Soldier
Sakura Wars - Demon, Limo Driver
Tekken: The Motion Picture - Thug 3
Metal Angel Marie - John, Additional Voices
Legend of Crystania - Captain Of The Sacred World, Garudi's Messenger, Sumash
Adventures of Kotetsu - Punk DKMY
Ninja Resurrection 2: Hell's Spawn - Godayu Toda
801 T.T.S. Airbats - Dream radio operator/Male cadet
Maps - Distressed Caller
Black Lion: Fear the Black Lion - Nobunaga
City Hunter: Bay City Wars - Additional Voices
City Hunter: Million Dollar Conspiracy - Additional Voices Commando, Civilian
City Hunter: .357 Magnum - Commando, Civilian
Shuten Doji: The Star Hand Kid 1 - Ketsumei Dolt

Miscellaneous Crew

Sakura Wars - (dubbing director: English)
Black Lion: Fear The Black Lion (ADR director/ADR script)

Producer
Black Lion: Fear the Black Lion

Other Jobs 

 CEO of Vyond (currently as of 2018)

References

External links

Living people
Male voice actors
Place of birth missing (living people)
Nationality missing
Voice directors
1962 births
People from Windsor, Berkshire